Donald Welbourne (born 12 March 1949) is an English former professional footballer who made more than 250 appearances in the Football League playing as a central defender for Scunthorpe United. He also played in the North American Soccer League (NASL) for the Boston Minutemen.

Career
Welbourne was born in Scunthorpe, Lincolnshire. He began his football career as an apprentice with Scunthorpe United, and made his debut as a 17-year-old in September 1966. After establishing himself in the first team a couple of years later, he spent seven seasons as a regular, and was part of the Fourth Division team that knocked First Division Sheffield Wednesday out of the 1969–70 FA Cup on Wednesday's own ground, before injury ended his professional career in November 1975. In 1969, he and Grimsby Town player Graham Rathbone were sent off for fighting, and each received an eight-week ban, "suspensions of unprecedented severity", according to The Times. Welbourne played for the Boston Minutemen, alongside Eusébio, as they won the Northern Division of the North American Soccer League in 1975. He later became a window-cleaner. He also played for Appleby Frodingham.
 
Welbourne's older brother Duncan was also a professional footballer who played more than 450 games for Watford.

References

External links
Profile and photos at NASLJerseys

1949 births
Living people
Sportspeople from Scunthorpe
English footballers
Association football defenders
Scunthorpe United F.C. players
Boston Minutemen players
English Football League players
North American Soccer League (1968–1984) players
English expatriate sportspeople in the United States
Expatriate soccer players in the United States
English expatriate footballers
Appleby Frodingham F.C. players